Jefferson County International Baccalaureate School (JCIB) is a public International Baccalaureate school located on the campus of Shades Valley High School in Irondale, Alabama. The school enrolls 372 students in grades 9-12 and is a part of the Jefferson County School System. It is consistently recognized as one of the best high schools in the country:
 JCIB was ranked first in Alabama and 9th in the U.S. in the 2016 Washington Post study of America's Most Challenging High Schools. 
 The Daily Beast ranked JCIB first in Alabama and 13th in the U.S. in its 2014 Top High Schools ranking.
 In 2005, 2006, 2007, and 2009 JCIB was ranked #1, #2, #4, and #3 respectively in the annual Newsweek poll of "The 100 Best High Schools in America".

Student profile 
JCIB students are diverse: 56% are white, 32% are African-American, 6% are Asian-American, 4% are Hispanic, and 2% are multiracial. Twenty percent of students qualified for free or reduced price lunch.

100% of JCIB students graduate and go on to attend four-year colleges and universities.  The 2016 graduating class earned approximately $12 million in college scholarships, an average of almost $160,000 per student.

JCIB students have an average ACT score of 29, and the average SAT score is 1,831. The most recent graduating class includes three National Merit & Achievement Finalists, 64 AP Scholars, 35 AP Scholars with Honor, 21 AP Scholars with Distinction, and two AP National Scholars.

Admission 
Students must apply to JCIB during the late winter prior to the year of anticipated enrollment. The application requires students to submit a transcript and test scores from their current schools, recommendations from both a mathematics and language arts instructor, and an application essay. Students are also strongly encouraged to attend an open house and/or shadow a student prior to applying.
Students must also pay tuition if they live outside Jefferson County. The tuition for students from other counties is $2200 per year.

Curriculum

AP & IB Courses 
All academic courses at JCIB are taught at an accelerated pace. Many courses prepare students for Advanced Placement or International Baccalaureate Exams. While all students are required to take a rigorous curriculum that includes both AP and IB coursework, students may choose whether to work toward earning an IB diploma. Approximately 64% of the 2015 graduating class received an IB diploma.

Creativity, Action, Service (CAS) Work/Study Program 
Beginning in 11th grade, JCIB's students participate in a work-study program every Wednesday afternoon. Students choose whether to take on an unpaid internship in a career area of interest, volunteer for a nonprofit organization, or perform some other community service. These hours contribute to the 150 CAS (Creativity, Action, Service) hours that are required in order to receive the IB diploma. All students participate in the CAS program, even if they do not pursue the IB diploma.

IB Extended Essay 
Students are required to write a 4,000-word extended essay on a topic of their choosing. The extended essay introduces students to the independent research and writing skills that will be necessary to succeed at top colleges and universities. Students choose research questions across a variety of subjects and work closely with JCIB faculty in executing their research and writing the essay.

Campus 
JCIB shares staff with Shades Valley High School, but has its own faculty for the core curriculum subjects of English, Foreign Languages, Mathematics, Science and Social Studies. As a school within a school, JCIB students are able to participate in activities specific to IB students as well as those for students at Shades Valley High School.

References 

Public high schools in Alabama
International Baccalaureate schools in Alabama
Schools in Jefferson County, Alabama
1973 establishments in Alabama
Educational institutions established in 1973